Art Skov (September 2, 1928 – April 19, 2009) was a referee and Supervisor of Officials in the National Hockey League, officiating more than 1,000 NHL games.

Career
After a junior season with the Windsor Spitfires in 1946, Skov played four seasons as a forward in the International Hockey League, most notably for the Detroit Hettche club, with whom he ended his playing career in 1952.  He then went into officiating, and after an apprenticeship in the minor leagues, joined the NHL as a linesman in 1956.

Becoming a referee full-time in 1960, Skov was named as the referee in the league's All-Star Game in 1964, 1970 and 1974, as well as in several Stanley Cup Finals and in the second Canada Cup series, as the first active NHL referee to officiate in international competition.

He went on to officiate 1,026 games before his retirement in 1975, as the league's senior referee. At the time of his retirement, he had refereed more games than any other referee in the history of the NHL.

Skov's younger brother Glen was a player in the NHL, most notably with the Detroit Red Wings, and the Skovs were the second player/official brother combination in league history, following Matt and Marty Pavelich, earlier in the 1956 season.

After his retirement as a referee, Skov became one of the league's Supervisors of Officials, before retiring from sports to run a trophy store in his native Windsor.  He is interred at Greenlawn Memorial Gardens in Windsor.

References

External links
 

1928 births
2009 deaths
Ice hockey people from Ontario
National Hockey League officials
Sportspeople from Windsor, Ontario